The Navy Warfare Development Command (NWDC) is a command of the United States Navy for the generation and development of innovations in concepts and doctrine for enhanced operational level maritime capability and integration in joint and coalition activities. The NWDC is currently located at Naval Station Norfolk, VA.

The NWDC team has a role in planning the future of the US Navy, not only in the tactical realm, but also at the operational and strategic levels.

History
The Chief of Naval Operations established the Navy Warfare Development Command in 1998. The NWDC coordinates the development of concepts of operations, doctrine, experimentation, and lessons learned in direct support of the Fleet. The command also provides cutting-edge modeling and simulation for training, experimentation, and focused analysis.

Concept Generation and Concept Development (CGCD) Program
The CNO initiated the CGCD program to encourage a culture of innovation throughout the Navy and to gather ideas on ways to address current and future warfighting gaps to inform investment decisions and develop full capability across doctrine, organization, training, materiel, leadership, education, personnel, and facilities (DOTMLPF) spectrum.

References

External links
Navy Warfare Development Command (NWDC)

Shore commands of the United States Navy
Military units and formations established in 1998